Richard A. Gleeson, S.J. (24 December 1861 - 23 December 1945) was appointed 13th president of Santa Clara University, Santa Clara, California, USA, (1905–10) after the presidency of Robert E. Kenna.

In December 1950 the University of San Francisco's Gleeson Library was dedicated and named for him.

References

Further reading
 

1816 births
1897 deaths
19th-century Italian Jesuits
Presidents of Santa Clara University
19th-century American clergy